The 1966–67 NCAA University Division men's basketball rankings was made up of two human polls, the AP Poll and the Coaches Poll.

Legend

AP Poll

UPI Poll

References 

1966-67 NCAA Division I men's basketball rankings
College men's basketball rankings in the United States